By-elections to the 3rd State Duma of the Russian Federation were held to fill vacant seats in the State Duma between the 1999 election and the 2003 election.

External links
Состав Государственной Думы третьего созыва
Депутаты Государственной Думы III созыва

2000 elections in Russia
2001 elections in Russia
2002 elections in Russia
 3
3rd State Duma of the Russian Federation